Broken Door is a Swedish musical pop / rock duo made up of Pier Schmid and Tobias Östlund. They are signed to Metronome / Warner Music.

The duo who had both studied music met in late 2006 for a possible cooperation. Pier Schmid had a number of hits earlier and a long experience in jazz. He is the songwriter half of the duo, and does the backing vocals. Tobias Östlund was a vocalist in various genres like rock, jazz, soul and had taken part in musicals. He is the main vocalist for Broken Door. The duo had their first major gig in January 2008 in Karlstad, Sweden.

Their debut single was "Angel" that reached #8 in Swedish Singles Chart. Their debut album Time for Changes debuted at #13 on its first week of release.

Discography

Albums

Singles

Videography
2008: "Angel" 
2009: "In the Shadow" 
2012: "Time for Changes"

References

External links
Official website
Myspace
YouTube
Last.fm

Swedish musical duos
Rock music duos